Washington Air Route Traffic Control Center (ZDC) is an Area Control Center operated by the Federal Aviation Administration and located at Lawson Rd SE, Leesburg, Virginia, United States. The primary responsibility of ZDC is the separation of airplane flights and the expedited sequencing of arrivals and departures along STARs (Standard Terminal Arrival Routes) and SIDs (Standard Instrument Departures) for the Washington-Baltimore Metropolitan Area, the New York Metropolitan Area, and Philadelphia among many other areas.

Washington Center is the second busiest (after Atlanta) ARTCC in the United States. Between January 1, 2017 and December 31, 2017, Washington Center handled 2,554,410 aircraft operations.

Basic breakdown of sectors
ZDC is divided into 8 areas, numbered 1 through 8, that make up 46 sectors. They are mainly broken down into low altitude, intermediate, high altitude and Super High Altitude sectors.  There are 18 low sectors, 14 high sectors, 5 super high sectors and 4 various other type sectors, including 1 high/low altitude sector and 3 intermediate altitude sectors.

AREA 1

Super-high sectors
 72 Shenandoah SHD 127.925 MHz/269.375 MHz
 07 Wahoo WAH 121.925 MHz/346.375 MHz

During periods of traffic saturation in the Shenandoah Sector, ZDC will split the Shenandoah sector into two sectors, making Wahoo a second Super High Sector over the Roanoke and Lynchburg, Virginia areas.  Shenandoah normally overlaps the Tech High and Gordonsville High Sectors above FL330.  When traffic demand is high, Wahoo is activated to overlap the Gordonsville High Sector above FL330 covering J37 and J75 from GVE VOR south while Shenandoah will overlap Tech High Sector above FL 330 and cover traffic on J48 from CSN VOR south, J22 from MOL VOR south and J53 south of ASBUR intersection near LWB VOR.

High sectors
 32 Gordonsville GVE 133.725/351.900
 52 Tech TEC 133.575/270.350

Intermediate sectors
 60 Montebello MOL 121.675/284.700

Low sectors
 31 Azalea AZA 135.400/263.100

AREA 2

High sectors 
 36 Raleigh RDU 118.925/322.450

Low sectors
 26 Sampson SAM 135.300/285.500
 27 Liberty LIB 135.200/348.650
 28 Rocky Mount RMT 118.475/279.650

AREA 3

High sectors 
 37 Marlinton MAR 133.025/323.025

Low sectors
 02 Casanova CSN 133.200/282.200
 05 Linden LDN 133.550/322.550
 22 South Boston SBV 124.050/352.000
 29 NEW Valley VAL (formerly Hot Springs HSP)134.400/353.900

Sector 30 OLD Valley VAL has been changed to NEW 72 Shenandoah SHD Super Hi Sector in Area 1 above.  Old Valley Sector merged into Sector 29 Hot Springs.

AREA 4

Super-high sectors
 42 Bryce BRY 118.025/226.675

High sectors
 03 Moorefield MOR 133.275/371.900
 04 Pinion PIN 133.975/307.025

Low sectors
 01 Elkins EKN 128.600/387.100
 06 Hagerstown HGR 134.150/227.125
 15 Blue Ridge BLR 133.650/285.600

AREA 5

Super-high sectors
 39 Snow Hill SWL 121.375/236.825
 50 Yorktown YKT 120.75/317.725

High sectors
 34 Norfolk ORF 133.825/327.800
 54 Salisbury SBY 120.975/257.700

Low sectors
 23 Cape Charles CCV 132.550/256.80
 51 Casino CAS 127.700/285.400
 53 Kenton ENO 132.050/354.150

AREA 6

Super-high sectors
 09 Dixon DIW 118.825/360.650

High sectors
 35 Wilmington ILM 124.025/269.150
 38 Tar River TYI 132.225/354.100

Low sectors
 24 Cofield CVI 123.850/323.000
 25 New Bern EWN 135.500/281.425
 33 Franklin FKN 132.025/290.425

AREA 7

High-altitude sectors
 10 Bay BAY 132.275/379.300
 12 Brooke BRV 126.875/327.000
 16 Hopewell HPW 121.875/323.225

Intermediate sectors
 11 Calvert CAL 133.900/281.400
 20 Blackstone BKT 127.750/235.625

Low sectors
 14 Irons IRS 132.950/351.800
 21 Dominion DOM 118.750/377.100

AREA 8

High sectors 
 58 Coyle CYN 121.025/254.300
 59 Sea Isle SIE 133.125/281.450

High-low sectors
 19 Woodstown OOD 125.450/363.000
 18 DuPont DQO 132.525/287.900

Low sectors
 17 Swann SWN 134.500/360.700

References

External links
 Washington ARTCC on IVAO
 Washington Air Route Traffic Control Center
 Washington Center Weather Service Unit (CWSU) (NWS/FAA)

Air traffic control centers
Air traffic control in the United States
WAAS reference stations
Aviation in Washington, D.C.
Year of establishment missing
Leesburg, Virginia